Kasaragod railway station (Code: KGQ) is a major railway station serving Kasaragod Town in the Kasaragod District, state of Kerala.

Line 
It lies in the Shoranur - Mangalore Section of the Southern Railway zone and is the first major stop for trains departing from Mangalore Central towards Kerala.

Infrastructure 

The station has three platforms and three tracks.

Since the station was built in 1898, Kasaragod was a prime destination due to its easy access to the nearest fort Bekalfort.

Services 

One train originate from this station. Fifty-seven trains pass through the station with a majority that serve it.

References

External links

Railway stations in Kasaragod district
Palakkad railway division